In mathematical set theory, a transitive model is a model of set theory that is standard and transitive. Standard means that the membership relation is the usual one, and transitive means that the model is a transitive set or class.

Examples
An inner model is a transitive model containing all ordinals.
A countable transitive model (CTM) is, as the name suggests, a transitive model with a countable number of elements.

Properties
 
If M is a transitive model, then ωM is the standard ω. This implies that the natural numbers, integers, and rational numbers of the model are also the same as their standard counterparts.   Each real number in a transitive model is a standard real number, although not all standard reals need be included in a particular transitive model.

References
 

Set theory